Asterivora microlitha is a species of moth in the family Choreutidae. It is endemic to New Zealand.

The wingspan is 9–10 mm. The head and thorax are irrorated (speckled) with white above and the antennae are dotted with white. The abdomen has strongly white segmental margins. The forewings are more narrowed towards the base than in similar species Asterivora ministra. Furthermore, the fasciae of white irroration are more strongly marked, the fourth is slender, but more sharply marked and brightly silvery-metallic above the discal mark and at the apex of the dorsal section. The hindwings have a white streak which is slender, regular and well-marked.

References

External links
Species of New Zealand Lepidoptera

Asterivora
Moths of New Zealand
Endemic fauna of New Zealand
Moths described in 1888
Taxa named by Edward Meyrick
Endemic moths of New Zealand